Holland is an unincorporated community in Wake County, North Carolina, United States, east of Five Points.

Neills Creek, a tributary to the Cape Fear River, rises in a pond in Holland.

References

Unincorporated communities in North Carolina
Unincorporated communities in Wake County, North Carolina